"I Was Made for Lovin' You" is a song by American hard rock band Kiss, originally released on their 1979 album, Dynasty. It was released as the A-side of their first single from the album, with "Hard Times" as the B-side.

History 
The song has become a permanent staple in Kiss's live performances. The band's performance of the song at their 30th anniversary show in Melbourne, Australia, was accompanied by the Melbourne Symphony Orchestra, who wore Kiss-style makeup with their tuxedos.
At first Desmond Child said, "Paul wanted to write a good disco song and I decided to help him with that. Paul started to write lyrics and chords then I played the song on the guitar and said 'OK, we'll do something to improve this and make it really a good song.

"I Was Made for Lovin' You" draws heavily from the disco style that was popular in late-1970s United States. According to legend, the members of the band were in conflict with their producers, who wanted the band to shift to a more commercial sound. In response, the band argued that lucrative disco songs could be written by anyone in a short time frame. The story goes that the song's demo was completed in mere hours after the bet. 

While the story is unproven, Paul Stanley, who co-wrote the song with Desmond Child and Vini Poncia, has stated that it was a conscious effort on his part to prove how easy it was to write and record a hit disco song. Child confirms that he and Stanley wrote the verses together in an hour at SIR Studios, while the "Motown-influenced" chorus was penned by Stanley and Poncia after Child had left the studio. Gene Simmons revealed in a 2018 interview that he always disliked the song because of his vocal part.

Although Peter Criss appears in the video and on the album cover, he did not actually play on the track. As with most of the Dynasty album, session drummer Anton Fig took his place, as Poncia had deemed Criss unfit to play. There is a bootleg audio recording of the writing sessions for the song in which Stanley mentions Criss's name a couple of times, indicating he was present during the arranging of the song. Stanley plays the rhythm guitar and bass guitar while Frehley provided the guitar solo. "The Return of KISS" was how Dynasty was billed in commercials and advertisements for the album.

Release
"I Was Made for Lovin' You" was Kiss's first songwriting collaboration with Desmond Child, who also wrote songs for the albums Animalize, Asylum, Crazy Nights, Smashes, Thrashes & Hits, and Hot in the Shade. While not as drastic as the 1979 "Radio Single Mix", the length of the song is edited by some eleven seconds down to 4 minutes and 16 seconds. Like the 1979 edit, the beginning measures of the song are reduced from four to two and the harmonizing following the guitar solo is halved.

The music video of "I Was Made for Lovin' You" was filmed on June 20, 1979, in the Savannah Civic Center in Savannah, Georgia, and was directed by John Goodhue. After the show was canceled, it was decided to use the already completed stage to film two videos. A promotional video was shot featuring the song performed on the Dynasty stage set, consisting simply of the band performing the song. The music video on YouTube has more than 500 million views. It was not included in the "Kissology" DVD series.

The B-side of the single is the album track "Hard Times", which was written by Ace Frehley.

Reception
"I Was Made for Lovin' You" was the band's second Gold single, selling over 1 million copies. The single was certified Gold in the U.S. on August 16, 1979, and in Canada on August 1, 1979.
The song was one of the band's few singles to chart in the UK in the 1970s, though peaking only at No. 50, where a 7 min 54 sec version was released on 12" single in addition to the shorter 7" version.

The single reached No. 11 on the U.S. Billboard singles chart and No. 1 in the Canadian RPM National singles chart (the band's second chart-topping single in that country, following "Shout It Out Loud"). It further became a hit in Australia reaching No. 2 on the ARIA charts in 1979. It also charted in Western Europe: it became a top 20 hit in Sweden, a top 10 hit in Norway, and made it to the number 2 position in France, Germany, Switzerland, and Austria. In the Netherlands it was a No. 1. In the UK it stalled at number 50.

Billboard Magazine described "I Was Made for Lovin' You" as a "catchy song" which is more melodic than previous Kiss efforts and that incorporates some disco influence and "heavy guitars."

Some Kiss fans dismissed it as a sell-out, with Rolling Stone magazine's David Fricke writing, "The Kiss army is going to mutiny when they hear 'I Was Made for Lovin’ You,' the disco-infected leadoff track on the Masked Marvels’ latest album. They'll demand to know why their heroes, after years of rallying the troops into battle against disco and other threatening schlock, have turned tail and joined forces with uptown popsters like producer Vini Poncia (whose soft-rock credentials include LPs by Ringo Starr and Melissa Manchester) and singer/tunesmith Desmond Child (who cowrote the offending song with Kiss’ Paul Stanley)." Lance Tawzer, curator of a museum exhibit chronicling the infamous Disco Demolition Night riot of 1979, suggested this song may have helped inspire that event, telling the Chicago Tribune, "That's Kiss' disco song, 'I Was Made for Lovin' You... That's the moment when they jumped that shark."

Despite the backlash, the song has become a concert staple over the years, with a different arrangement that de-emphasizes the song's disco elements. Gene Simmons has stated that "I Was Made for Lovin' You" is his least favorite Kiss song, and Ace Frehley and Peter Criss have also indicated that they dislike the song.

Chart performance

Weekly singles charts

Year-end charts

Sales and certifications

Personnel
Paul Stanley – lead & backing vocals, rhythm guitar, bass
Gene Simmons – backing vocals
Ace Frehley – lead guitar, backing vocals
Anton Fig – drums
Vini Poncia – synthesizer, backing vocals

Scooter version 

A cover version of the song by German group Scooter. This cover was released as a double a-side  with "We Are the Greatest" on 21 September 1998.

Track listing
CD single
"We Are the Greatest" (3:27)
"I Was Made for Lovin' You" (3:32)
"We Are the Greatest" (Extended) (4:35)
"Greatest Beats" (3:05)

12-inch maxi-single
"We Are the Greatest" (Extended) (4:35)
"We Are the Greatest" (3:27)
"I Was Made for Lovin' You" (3:32)

Chart performance

Other notable versions
American boy band Menudo covered the song in Spanish as "Fui Hecho Para Amarte" on their Xanadu album during 1981, the cover was also appeared on their first film, 1981's Menudo: La Pelicula.

Paulina Rubio
Mexican pop singer Paulina Rubio recorded the song with producer Brian Rawling for her sixth studio album, Border Girl, in 2002 at Soundtrack Studios in New York.

Rubio's version received positive reviews from critics. While reviewing Border Girl, Jose F. Promis of AllMusic selected the song as highlights, describing "almost unbelievably" as emblematic original version. MTV Asia declared "Gene Simmons and company would have died to have a groupie like her," while Rolling Stone saying, Rubio's version "replacing that song's roller coaster vocal howls with Rubio's sensuous purr and a dumbed-down dance beat."

Rubio's first performed the song on the 2002 MTV Video Music Awards Latinoamérica. As well, performed the song on her Amor, Luz y Sonido Tour in 2007.

Oliver Heldens, VINAI & Le Pedre 
Dutch DJ Oliver Heldens reworked the song with vocals provided by Nile Rodgers and British vocal group House Gospel Choir (HGC).

Notes and references

Kiss (band) songs
1979 singles
American disco songs
RPM Top Singles number-one singles
Songs written by Desmond Child
Songs written by Vini Poncia
Songs written by Paul Stanley
Casablanca Records singles
Rock ballads
Dutch Top 40 number-one singles
Number-one singles in New Zealand
1970s ballads